Parmelia was a barque built in Quebec, Canada, in 1825. Originally registered on 31 May in Quebec, she sailed to Great Britain and assumed British registry. She made one voyage for the British East India Company (EIC), in 1827–1828. In 1829 she transported the first civilian officials and settlers of the Swan River Colony to Western Australia. She then made two voyages transporting convicts to New South Wales, Australia. A fire damaged her irreparably in May 1839.

Career
Parmelia "was more of a plain working girl than the great and beautiful lady of the sea". Parmelia sailed to London and on 17 November she was transferred from the Quebec to the London register. In 1826 she was used as a troop carrier.

EIC voyage
Some time in the first half of 1827, Parmelia was sold to Joseph Somes, who was also a director of the EIC.  For the next year, she operated under charter to the British East India Company, carrying goods and passengers between London and Bengal.

Captain John Wimble sailed from the Downs on 19 June 1827, bound for Bengal and Madras. Parmelia arrived at Calcutta on 3 December. Homeward bound, she was at Fultahm, on the Hooghly River, on 18 January 1828. She was at Vizagapatam on 30 January, and Madras on 9 February. She reached Saint Helena on  30 April and arrived at the Downs on 3 July.

Settlers to Western Australia
Stirling, whom the government had appointed the civil superintendent of the colony, however argued that the passengers and goods to be carried exceeded the capacity of Sulphur, and asked that an additional ship to be chartered. The government reluctantly agreed to the extra cost, chartering Parmelia in December 1828. It was then arranged that Sulphur would carry a detachment of the 63rd Regiment, with Parmelia carrying the civilian officials and settlers.

Sulphur and Parmelia sailed from Spithead off Portsmouth, England on 3 or 6 February 1829, sighting their destination on 1 June. Contrary to popular belief, Stirling did not captain Parmelia (J. H. Luscombe did); on arrival, however, he assumed the duties of pilot. He initially tried to enter Cockburn Sound through a passage that he had discovered in 1827, but was prevented by strong winds and a heavy swell. Instead he chose to remain off Rottnest Island for the night. The following day, he tried to bring Parmelia into the Sound from the north, against the advice of Fremantle, and ran aground on a sand bank, later to be named Parmelia Bank. Despite the best efforts of the crews to dislodge her, Parmelia remained on the bank for over 18 hours, finally coming off the bank by herself early the following morning. Parmelia then rode out a storm at anchor for three days before finally being brought to a safe anchorage. The passengers were able to disembark on 8 June.

Challenger was due to depart once Sulphur and Parmelia had arrived, but Parmelia needed repairs that it could not get without access to the skilled labour amongst Challenger crew. Fremantle therefore took the decision to remain and assist with the repairs, which were completed many weeks later. Later that year, Stirling chartered Parmelia to bring food supplies from Java. In 1830, she returned to England via Singapore.

Convict voyage #1 (1832)
Captain James Gilbert sailed from Sheerness on 28 July 1832. Parmelia arrived at Sydney on 16 November. She had embarked 200 male convicts and she landed 196, four having died en route. Parmelia sailed from Sydney late in December 1832 and arrived in Batavia on 29 January 1833. She left Batavia on 5 March, reached Saint Helena on 17 May, and arrived back at Portsmouth on 8 August.

Convict voyage #2 (1833–1834)
Captain James Gilbert sailed from Cork on 27 October 1833. Parmelia arrived at Sydney on 2 March 1834. She embarked 220 male convicts and she landed 218, two convicts having died en route. On 12 April Parmelia sailed for Manila.

Troop transport
In 1837 Parmelia and  transported troops for the British government. On 19 January they carried the 82 Regiment of Foot from Dublin to Gibraltar. They then carried the 59th regiment of Foot from Gibraltar to Malta. On 14 March they carried the 5th Regiment of Foot from Malta to the Ionian Islands. Once they had completed the task, the British government hired the two vessels for £1,281 7s 9d to carry the remnants of the British Auxiliary Legion back from Spain to England.

Fate
Parmelia then continued to sail as a London-based transport. She was last listed in 1838 with J. Spence, master, J. Somes, owner, and trade London-transport.
In 1839 Parmelia was refitted to carry migrants to the Americas. She was intended to run between Britain and Quebec, but on 1 May 1839, as her refit was almost complete, a fire in Bank's Yard, at Frank's Queery, Cremyll, destroyed her. Eight days later she was surveyed and declared a constructive total loss. She was then sold for breaking up.

The Kwinana suburb of Parmelia is named in honour of Parmelia, as is Parmelia Bank.

Passengers on Parmelia, 1829

The following people embarked Parmelia when she left Portsmouth in February 1829.

Notes

Citations

References

 

 

1825 ships
Ships built in Quebec
Age of Sail merchant ships
Convict ships to New South Wales
Immigrant ships to Western Australia
Merchant ships of the United Kingdom
Maritime incidents in May 1839